Is That Black Enough for You?!? (stylized in all caps) is a 2022 documentary film and film essay written and directed by Elvis Mitchell. It examines the history, craft and legacy of African-American cinema—with a focus on the films released in the 1970s—and makes use of film excerpts, personal history, and recent interviews with artists such as Margaret Avery, Harry Belafonte, Charles Burnett, Laurence Fishburne, Whoopi Goldberg, Samuel L. Jackson, Suzanne de Passe, Glynn Turman, Billy Dee Williams, and Zendaya.

Is That Black Enough for You?!? premiered at the 60th New York Film Festival on October 9, 2022. The film was released on Netflix on November 11, 2022.

Synopsis
Culture critic and historian Elvis Mitchell traces the evolution — and revolution — of Black cinema from its origins to the impactful films of the 1970s. The film borrows its title from a recurring line in Cotton Comes To Harlem (1970).

Release
Is That Black Enough for You?!? premiered at the 60th New York Film Festival on October 9, had its limited theatrical release on October 28 and was released on Netflix on November 11, 2022.

Reception
On the review aggregator website Rotten Tomatoes, Is That Black Enough For You?!? holds a perfect score of 100%, based on 40 reviews with an average rating of 8.1/10. The site's consensus reads: "An indispensable watch for film buffs, Is That Black Enough for You?!? shines a sorely needed spotlight on a remarkably rich period in the medium's history." On Metacritic, which uses a weighted average, the film has a score of 83 out of 100 based on 16 reviews, indicating "universal acclaim".

References

External links

Official trailer
Interview with Elvis Mitchell on American Film Institute's official YouTube channel

2022 documentary films
African-American culture
African-American films
Essays about film
Films about the film industry
Films set in the 1970s